Polcon is the oldest Polish speculative fiction convention, organized each year in a different place by the local speculative fiction club. The Janusz A. Zajdel Award is awarded during the convention. The first Polcon was held in 1985 in Błażejewko near Poznań.

List of Polcons
Polcon's location is chosen two years in advance during the convention itself; for example, the location of 2016 Polcon (Wrocław) was chosen during Polcon 2014 (Bielsko-Biała).

2022 - Kraków
2021 - Zielona Góra
2020 - was not held
2019 - Białystok
2018 - Toruń
2017 - Lublin
2016 - Wrocław
2015 - Poznań
2014 - Bielsko-Biała
2013 - Warsaw
2012 - Wrocław
2011 - Poznań
2010 - Cieszyn and Český Těšín, with Eurocon and 
2009 - Łódź
2008 - Zielona Góra
2007 - Warsaw
2006 - Lublin
2005 - Błażejewko near Poznań
2004 - Zielona Góra
2003 - Elbląg
2002 - Kraków
2001 - Katowice
2000 - Gdynia
1999 - Warsaw
1998 - Białystok
1997 - Katowice
1996 - was not held
1995 - Jastrzębia Góra
1994 - Lublin
1993 - Waplewo
1992 - Białystok
1991 - Kraków
1990 - Waplewo
1989 - Gdańsk
1988 - Katowice
1987 - Warsaw
1986 - Katowice
1985 - Błażejewko near Poznań

External links

http://www.polcon.fandom.art.pl

Festivals in Poland
Recurring events established in 1985
Science fiction conventions in Europe
Polish science fiction
Articles containing video clips
1985 establishments in Poland